Rex Smith (born 1955) is an American actor and singer.

Rex Smith may refer to:

 Rex Smith (American football) (1896–1972), National Football League player
 Rex Smith (baseball) (1864–1895), born Henry W. Schmidt, professional baseball player
 Rex Smith, editor of the Albany Times Union since 2002
 Rex Smith Biplane, a pioneering biplane